Pautovka is a rural locality (a selo) in Dmitriyevsky Selsoviet of Mazanovsky District, Amur Oblast, Russia. The population was 98 as of 2018. There are 5 streets.

Geography 
Pautovka is located on the left bank of the Birma River, 57 km south of Novokiyevsky Uval (the district's administrative centre) by road. Margaritovka is the nearest rural locality.

References 

Rural localities in Mazanovsky District